Tobaccoland 30th Anniversary Show is an a cappella album by the Richmond chapter of SPEBSQSA, a barbershop men's singing group called the Tobaccoland Chorus.

Liner notes
According to the liner notes, this album was recorded live at Richmond's Thomas Jefferson High School on March 26, 1982 and March 27, 1982. This album also includes many songs from chapter quartets: Nickel Bridge, Stage Door, Treasure Chest, Friends of Yesterday.

Track listing

Side one
 "It's Barbershop Harmony Time" (Chorus)
 "You'll Never Go Wrong with a Song" (Chorus)
 "Heart of My Heart Medley" (Chorus)
 "Meet Me in Rose Time, Rosie" (Nickel Bridge)
 "Lida Rose" (Nickel Bridge & Chorus)
 "Sweet Gypsy Rose" (Chorus)
 "My Wild Irish Rose" (Chorus)
 "Goin' Back to Dixieland" (Nickel Bridge)
 "Ma, She's Makin' Eyes at Me" (Nickel Bridge)
 "Minstrel Montage" (Chorus)
 "Mary, You're a Little Bit Old Fashioned" (Stage Door)
 "I'll Fly Away" (Chorus)
 "From the First Hello to the Last Goodbye" (Stage Door)
 "How's Every Little Thing in Dixie" (Stage Door)
 "My Wife the Dancer" (Chorus)
 "Keep Your Sunny Side Up" (Chorus)

Side two
 "The Barbershop Strut" (Treasure Chest)
 "Down by the Old Mill Stream" (Treasure Chest)
 "The Preacher and the Bear" (Treasure Chest)
 "Frog Kissin (Treasure Chest)
 "If a Picture Paints a Thousand Words" (Treasure Chest)
 "Side by Side / By the Sea Medley" (Treasure Chest)
 "The River of No Return" (Treasure Chest)
 "Alabamy Medley" (Friends of Yesterday)
 "That Old Sweetheart of Mine" (Friends of Yesterday)
 "Wait'll You See My Grandma" (Friends of Yesterday)
 "Danny Boy" (Friends of Yesterday)
 "If She Looks Good to Mother" (Friends of Yesterday)
 "Sweet Adeline" (Friends of Yesterday)
 "Gonna Build a Mountain" (Friends of Yesterday)
 "Oh Shenandoah" (Chorus)
 "For All We Know" (Chorus)

1982 live albums
Self-released albums
Tobaccoland Chorus albums